Rosedale is an unincorporated community in Jersey County, Illinois, United States. It is located south of Fieldon and is just north of Pere Marquette State Park.

References

Unincorporated communities in Illinois
Unincorporated communities in Jersey County, Illinois